Doubravník is a market town in Brno-Country District in the South Moravian Region of the Czech Republic. It has about 800 inhabitants. The historic centre is well preserved and is protected by law as an urban monument zone.

Administrative parts
The village of Křížovice is an administrative part of Doubravník.

Geography
It lies in the Upper Svratka Highlands. The built-up area is situated in a valley of the Svratka River.

History
The first written mention of Doubravník is from 1208, when a Franciscan convent was founded here and a church consecrated to the Holy Cross already stood here.

Sights
The Church of the Exaltation of the Holy Cross includes the tomb of the Mitrovský family from 1867. The tomb contains 19 cast iron sarcophagi with craft, historical and architectural value.

The town square contains preserved old houses. The house No. 35 is older than the church and has valuable Gothic gate.

References

External links

Populated places in Brno-Country District
Market towns in the Czech Republic